Debbie Drake is a former American fitness and nutrition guru. Drake is most well-known for presenting the The Debbie Drake Show between 1960–1978.

Career

Drake's career started after starting a local exercise show on regional television before being gaining popularity and being syndicated nationwide.

In 2015, Drake was inducted into the National Fitness Hall of Fame.

References

External links

Living people
American exercise and fitness writers
American exercise instructors
American health and wellness writers
Year of birth missing (living people)